At the 1906 Summer Olympics in Athens, eight events in fencing were contested, all for men only. Now called the Intercalated Games, the 1906 Games are no longer considered as an official Olympic Games by the International Olympic Committee.

Medal summary

Medal table

Participating nations
A total of 62 fencers, all men, from 12 nations competed at the Intercalated Games:

References

1906 Intercalated Games events
1906
International fencing competitions hosted by Greece